Kerrie Hayes (born 13 March 1987) is an English actress.

Background
Born and brought up in Anfield, Liverpool, Hayes is one of five siblings. She has two older sisters and two younger brothers. She attended Holly Lodge Girls' College in West Derby, where her interest in acting began after she joined a drama class with her sister, and later Liverpool Community College.

Career
Hayes made her professional and television debut in BBC drama Lilies, playing the lead role of Ruby Moss. She has made guest appearances in Holby City, The Commander, Casualty, Inspector George Gently and four episodes of Doctors.

Hayes' film credits include Sparkle (2007), Nowhere Boy (2009), Kicks (2009), playing the lead role of Nicole, and Rowan Joffé's remake of Brighton Rock (2010).

She was selected for the 2009 Trailblazer showcase, an annual initiative at the Edinburgh International Film Festival highlighting new talent, for her performance in Kicks.
She has appeared in two series of the Channel 4 period drama The Mill in which she was nominated for the Bafta award for Leading Actress. She portrayed Gwen Pearce in the 2016 BBC TV drama series The Living and the Dead.

Filmography

Film

Television

Awards and nominations

References

External links

Actresses from Liverpool
English television actresses
English film actresses
1987 births
Living people
People from Anfield